Rosario Begoña Casado Sobrino (1961 – 15 July 2021) was a Spanish politician and pharmacist. A member of the People's Party (PP), she served in the Senate of Spain from 2004 to 2008.

Biography
After earning her pharmacy license, she owned and operated a pharmacy in Albacete. She was a member of the Regional Executive Committee of the People's Party in Albacete, serving in the city council and once running for Mayor.

Rosario Casado died in Albacete on 15 July 2021.

References

1961 births
2021 deaths
Members of the 8th Senate of Spain
Spanish women in politics
People's Party (Spain) politicians
Spanish pharmacists
People from Almería